Tuulola is a Finnish surname. Notable people with the surname include:

Eetu Tuulola (born 1998), Finnish ice hockey player
Joni Tuulola (born 1996), Finnish ice hockey player
Marko Tuulola (born 1971), Finnish ice hockey player 

Finnish-language surnames